Oliver Huntemann (born 19 June 1968 in Hannover) is a German electronic music producer and internationally touring DJ.

Selected discography

Albums
 Propaganda (October 2017 - Senso Sounds)
 Paranoia (November 2011 - Confused Recordings)
 H-3 (May 2009 – Ideal Audio)
 Fieber (March 2006 – Confused Recordings/Gigolo Records)
 Too Many Presents For One Girl (2004 – Confused Recordings)

Singles
 Poltergeist (September 2017 - Senso Sounds)
 Rotlicht (July 2017 - Senso Sounds)
 Shanghai Spinner (June 2009 - Ideal Audio)
 Rikarda (February 2009 – Ideal Audio)
 PLAY! 02 ep: Paris/La Boum (April 2008 – Confused Recordings)
 Hamburger Berg (Dec 2007 – Confused Recordings)
 PLAY! 01 ep: São Paulo (Mar 2007 – Confused Recordings)
 German Beauty (Dec 2006 – Confused Recordings)
 Fieber Remixes (Aug 2006 – Confused Recordings)
 Broadcast Service (September 2005 – Dance Electric)
 Terminate The Fire (feat. Chelonis R. Jones) (July 2005 – Dance Electric)
 Sweet Sensations (May 2005 – Confused Recordings/Gigolo Records)
 DiscoTech UK Mixes – (November 2003 – Confused Recordings)
 Freeze (September 2003 – Confused Recordings)
 DiscoTech (2003 – Confused Recordings / Zomba)
 Phreaks 2.1 (2001 – Panik)
 Wildes Treiben (2001 – Confused Recordings)
 Alte Liebe (2000 – Confused Recordings)
 Playground (1997 – Confused Recordings)
 Electric City (1996 – Confused Recordings)
 Styles (1995 – Confused Recordings)

References

External links
 Oliver Huntemann official
 Oliver Huntemann's Ideal Audio label site
 Oliver Huntemann at Discogs

1968 births
Living people
German techno musicians
German electronic musicians
German DJs
Musicians from Hanover
People from Oldenburg (city)
DJs from Hamburg
Musicians from Hamburg
Electronic dance music DJs